Nesiotinus is a genus of lice belonging to the family Philopteridae. The genus was first described in 1903 by Vernon Lyman Kellogg, and the type species is Nesiotinus demersus.

The species of this genus are found infesting King Penguins.

Species 
Species:
Nesiotinus demersus 
Nesiotinus kerguelensis

References 

Taxa described in 1903
Taxa named by Vernon Lyman Kellogg
Lice